Michael Diamond Resnick (March 5, 1942 – January 9, 2020) was an American science fiction writer and editor. He won five Hugo awards and a Nebula award, and was the guest of honor at Chicon 7.  He was the executive editor of the defunct magazine Jim Baen's Universe, and the creator and editor of Galaxy's Edge magazine.

Biography
Resnick was born in Chicago on March 5, 1942. He was a 1959 graduate of Highland Park High School in Highland Park, Illinois. He sold his first piece of writing in 1957, while still in high school. He attended the University of Chicago from 1959 to 1961 and met his future wife, Carol L. Cain, there. The couple began dating in mid-December 1960 and were engaged by the end of the month. They were married in 1961. 

In the 1960s and early 1970s, Resnick wrote over 200 erotic adult novels under various pseudonyms and edited three men's magazines and seven tabloid newspapers. For over a decade he wrote a weekly column about horse racing and a monthly column about purebred collies, which he and his wife bred and showed. His wife was an uncredited collaborator on much of his science fiction and a co-author on two movie scripts they sold, based on his novels Santiago and The Widowmaker. His daughter Laura Resnick is a science fiction and fantasy author. 

Resnick lived in Cincinnati from 1976 until his death following a battle with cancer on January 9, 2020.

Work and themes
Two notable motifs are evident in much of Resnick's science fiction work—his love of fable and legend. The other main subject of his work is Africa, especially Kenya's Kikuyu people, their history, traditions and culture and colonialism and its aftermath. He visited Kenya often and drew on his experiences there. Some of his science fiction stories are allegories of Kenyan history and politics; other stories are actually set in Africa or have African characters.

Resnick's style is known for its humor. He enjoyed collaborating with other writers, especially on short stories. Through 2014 he had collaborated with 52 different writers on short fiction, three on screenplays, and three on novels. Late in life, he began writing and selling a series of mystery novels as well, featuring detective Eli Paxton. He had also sold screenplays based on his novels to Miramax, Capella, and Jupiter 9, and often had multiple properties under option to Hollywood studios.

His work has been translated into: French, Italian, German, Spanish, Japanese, Korean, Bulgarian, Hungarian, Hebrew, Russian, Latvian, Lithuanian, Polish, Czech, Dutch, Latin, Swedish, Romanian, Finnish, Portuguese, Slovakian, Chinese, Catalan, Danish,  Croatian, and Greek. Resnick's papers are in the Special Collections Library of the University of South Florida in Tampa.

Editing 
Resnick worked as an editor for National Insider from 1966 to 1969, and also as editor-in-chief of National Features Syndicate from 1967 to 1968. He was a publisher and editor for Oligarch Press from 1969 onwards. From 1988 on Resnick edited over 40 fiction anthologies. He was an editorial consultant for BenBella Books from 2004 to 2006 and executive editor of Jim Baen's Universe from 2007 through 2010. From 2011 he was the series' editor for The Stellar Guild series published by Phoenix Pick. The series pairs lesser-known science fiction and fantasy authors with best-selling veterans of the genre. Beginning in 2013, he was the editor of the bi-monthly magazine Galaxy's Edge, published by Arc Manor, which reprints work by major names in the field along with new stories by new and lesser-known writers.

Fandom 
Resnick and his wife were participants in science fiction fandom from 1962. As of 2012 Resnick had been the guest of honor at some 42 science fiction conventions and toastmaster at a dozen others. Resnick's wife created costumes in which she and Resnick appeared at five Worldcon masquerades in the 1970s, winning four out of five contests.

Selected awards and honors
In 2012 he was the guest of honor at Chicon 7, the 70th World Science Fiction Convention in Chicago.

Hugo awards
Resnick was nominated for 37 Hugo Awards and won five times.

 1989: "Kirinyaga" for Best Short Story
 1991: "The Manamouki" for Best Novelette
 1995: "Seven Views of Olduvai Gorge" for Best Novella
 1998: "The 43 Antarean Dynasties" for Best Short Story
 2005: "Travels with My Cats" for Best Short Story

In addition to his wins he was nominated for "For I Have Touched the Sky" (1990), "Winter Solstice" and "One Perfect Morning, With Jackals" (1992), "The Lotus and the Spear" (1993), "Mwalimu in the Squared Circle" (1994), "Barnaby in Exile" and "A Little Knowledge" (1995), "When the Old Gods Die" and "Bibi" (with Susan Shwartz, 1996), "The Land of Nod" (1997), "Hothouse Flowers" and "Hunting the Snark" (2000), "The Elephants on Neptune" and "Redchapel" (2001), "Old MacDonald Had a Farm" (2002), "Robots Don't Cry" (2004), "A Princess of Earth" (2005), "Down Memory Lane" (2006), "All the Things You Are" (2007), "Distant Replay" (2008), "Alastair Baffle's Emporium of Wonders" and "Article of Faith" (2009), "The Bride of Frankenstein" (2010), and "The Homecoming" (2012). In 1995 he was the first person to be nominated for four Hugos in a single year. His 37 Hugo nominations through 2015 were an all-time record for a writer at the time.

He was also nominated for Best Editor in 1994, 1995, and 2015; for his Chicon 7 Guest of Honor speech in 2007; and for the nonfiction Putting It Together: Turning Sow's Ear Drafts Into Silk Purse Stories (2001), I Have This Nifty Idea...Now What Do I Do With It? (2002), and The Business of Science Fiction (with Barry N. Malzberg) in 2011.

Other awards
Resnick won one Nebula Award from eleven nominations, and numerous other awards from places as diverse as France, Japan, Spain, Croatia, and Poland.

His Hugo Award-winning novella "Seven Views of Olduvai Gorge" also won the S.F. Chronicle Poll Award for the same, the corresponding 1994 Nebula Award for Best Novella and the 1995 HOMer Award for Best Novella. Between 1991 and 2001, he won a further nine HOMer Awards (bringing his total to 10, from 24 nominations). This placed him at the head of HOMer Award winners, ahead of Robert J. Sawyer with nine wins from 12 nominations.

His 1998 and 2005 Hugo Award-winning stories—"The 43 Antarean Dynasties" and "Travels with My Cats"—also garnered him Asimov's Reader Poll Awards, of which he won a total of five (from 20 nominations), placing him in second place tied with poet Bruce Boston, behind artist Bob Eggleton. He won a total of six S.F. Chronicle Poll Awards, one Locus Award (from 30 nominations, winning in 1996 with "When the Old Gods Die"), a Golden Pagoda Award, two American Dog Writers Awards and an Alexander Award. 

In 1995, he was awarded the Skylark (or the Edward E. Smith Memorial Award for Imaginative Fiction) for Lifetime Achievement in Science Fiction. In 2017 he was awarded Writers and Illustrators of the Future's Lifetime Achievement Award.

International awards
"Seven Views of Olduvai Gorge" also won awards in Spain (Ignotus Award), France (Prix Ozone Award) and Croatia (Futura Poll), contributing to a total of three Ignotus Awards and two Prix Ozone Awards. He was awarded the Spanish El Melocoton Mecanico Award for "Old MacDonald Had a Farm" and the Xatafi-Cyberdark Award for "For I Have Touched the Sky", in addition to a Tour Eiffel Award in France for The Dark Lady.

In Japan, he won the Seiun-sho Award for Kirinyaga: A Fable of Utopia, and the Hayakawa Award for "For I Have Touched the Sky". In Poland, "Kirinyaga" won the Nowa Fantastyka Poll Award, while "For I Have Touched the Sky" and "When the Old Gods Die" won SFinks awards. He won Catalonia's Ictineus Award in 2012 for Best Translated Story for "Soulmates", a collaboration with Lezli Robyn.

Mike Resnick Memorial Award
The Mike Resnick Award for Short Fiction was established in 2021 in Resnick’s honor. Contenders must be new, previously unpublished authors. Winners receive a trophy and a cash prize of $250.

The first winner was Z.T. Bright  for his story, "The Measure of a Mother's Love."

Series bibliography

Resnick wrote more than 70 novels and published over 25 collections. He edited more than 40 anthologies. Fiona Kelleghan compiled Mike Resnick: An Annotated Bibliography and Guide to His Work (Farthest Star, 2000). Adrienne Gormley completed a 679-page second edition, which was published in 2012. This is a list of his series.

Ganymede
 The Goddess of Ganymede (1968)
 Pursuit on Ganymede (1968)

Far Future History
 Birthright (1982)
 Santiago (1980)
 The Dark Lady (1987)

Galactic Midway
 Sideshow (1982)
 The Three-legged Hootch Dancer (1983)
 The Wild Alien Tamer (1983)
 The Best Rootin' Tootin' Shootin' Gunslinger in the Whole Damned Galaxy (1983)

Velvet Comet
 Eros Ascending (1984)
 Eros At Zenith (1984)
 Eros Descending (1985)
 Eros At Nadir (1986)

Lucifer Jones
 Adventures (1985)
 Exploits (1993)
 Encounters (1994)
 Hazards (2009)
 Voyages (2017)

Fables of Tonight
 Stalking the Unicorn (1987)
 Stalking the Vampire (2008)
 Stalking the Dragon (2009)
 Stalking the Zombie (2012)

Galactic Comedy
 Paradise (1989)
 Purgatory (1993)
 Inferno (1993)

Tales of Kirinyaga
 Kirinyaga (1991)
 For I Have Touched the Sky (1989)
 Bwana (1999)

Oracle
 Soothsayer (1991)
 Oracle (1992)
 Prophet (1993)

Widowmaker
 The Widowmaker (1996)
 The Widowmaker Reborn (1997)
 The Widowmaker Unleashed (1998)
 A Gathering of Widowmakers (2005)

Eli Paxton Mystery
 Dog in the Manger (1997)
 The Trojan Colt (2013)
 Cat on a Cold Tin Roof (2014)

Starship
 Mutiny (2005)
 Pirate (2006)
 Mercenary (2007)
 Rebel (2008)
 Flagship (2009)

Weird West Tale
 The Buntline Special (2010)
 The Doctor and the Kid (2011)
 The Doctor and the Rough Rider (2012)
 The Doctor and the Dinosaurs (2013)

Dead Enders
 The Fortress in Orion (2014)
 The Prison in Antares (2015)
 The Castle in Cassiopeia (2017)

Gods of Sagittarius (with Eric Flint)
 Gods of Sagittarius (2017)

Dreamscape Trilogy
 The Master of Dreams (2019)
 The Mistress of Illusions (2020)

References

External links

Bibliography – cleaner and easier to read than the one at the official site, but the short stories is updated only through 2001

1942 births
2020 deaths
Deaths from cancer in Ohio
20th-century American novelists
21st-century American novelists
American fantasy writers
American male novelists
American male short story writers
American online publication editors
American science fiction writers
Asimov's Science Fiction people
Hugo Award-winning writers
Nebula Award winners
Science fiction editors
Writers from Chicago
20th-century American short story writers
21st-century American short story writers
20th-century American male writers
21st-century American male writers
Novelists from Illinois
Writers from Cincinnati
Novelists from Ohio